Caylib Rees Oosthuizen (born 1 September 1989) is a South African professional rugby union player who plays as a loosehead prop for Tel Aviv Heat in Rugby Europe Super Cup.

Career

He was subsequently invited  to one of the Springboks preliminary training camps.

In 2013, he was included in the  squad for the 2013 Super Rugby season. He started in 13 of the 16 super rugby games that year.

Oosthuizen previously represented the University of Johannesburg in the 2011 Varsity Cup where he started all 8 of his sides' matches.

International

Oosthuizen represented South Africa under 20 in the 2009 IRB Junior World Championship in Japan.

References

External links
itsrugby.co.uk Profile

1989 births
Living people
South African rugby union players
Golden Lions players
Lions (United Rugby Championship) players
Free State Cheetahs players
Cheetahs (rugby union) players
Rugby union props
Rugby union players from Cape Town
University of Johannesburg alumni
South Africa Under-20 international rugby union players
Eastern Province Elephants players
Stormers players
Western Province (rugby union) players
South African expatriate rugby union players
Expatriate rugby union players in Australia
Melbourne Rebels players
Tel Aviv Heat players
South African expatriate sportspeople in Israel
Expatriate rugby union players in Israel